Umajuri is a village in  Bagerhat District in the Khulna Division of southwestern Bangladesh.

Refer Bangladesadesh.[1]

External links
Satellite map at Maplandia.com

Populated places in Pirojpur District
Villages in Bagerhat District